In applied mathematical analysis, shearlets are a multiscale framework which allows efficient encoding of anisotropic features in multivariate problem classes. Originally, shearlets were introduced in 2006 for the analysis and sparse approximation of functions  . They are a natural extension of wavelets, to accommodate the fact that multivariate functions are typically governed by anisotropic features such as edges in images, since wavelets, as isotropic objects, are not capable of capturing such phenomena.

Shearlets are constructed by parabolic scaling, shearing, and translation applied to a few generating functions. At fine scales, they are essentially supported within skinny and directional ridges following the parabolic scaling law, which reads length² ≈ width. Similar to wavelets, shearlets arise from the affine group and allow a unified treatment of the continuum and digital situation leading to faithful implementations.

One of the most important properties of shearlets is their ability to provide optimally sparse approximations (in the sense of optimality in ) for cartoon-like functions . The decay rate of the -error of the -term shearlet approximation obtained by taking the  largest coefficients from the shearlet expansion is in fact optimal up to a log-factor:

This approximation rate significantly improves the best -term approximation rate of wavelets providing only  for such class of functions.

Shearlets are to date the only directional representation system that provides sparse approximation of anisotropic features while providing a unified treatment of the continuum and digital realm that allows faithful implementation. A comprehensive presentation of the theory and applications of shearlets can be found in.

Definition

Continuous shearlet systems 

The construction of continuous shearlet systems is based on parabolic scaling matrices

as a mean to change the resolution, on shear matrices

as a means to change the orientation, and finally on translations to change the positioning. 
In comparison to curvelets, shearlets use shearings instead of rotations, the advantage being that the shear operator  leaves the integer lattice invariant in case , i.e.,  This indeed allows a unified treatment of the continuum and digital realm, thereby guaranteeing a faithful digital implementation.

and the corresponding continuous shearlet transform is given by the map

Discrete shearlet systems 

From this, the discrete shearlet system associated with the shearlet generator  is defined by

and the associated discrete shearlet transform is defined by

Examples 

Let  be a function satisfying the discrete Calderón condition, i.e.,

where  denotes the Fourier transform of  For instance, one can choose  to be a Meyer wavelet. Furthermore, let  be such that   and

One typically chooses  to be a smooth bump function. Then  given by

is called a classical shearlet. It can be shown that the corresponding discrete shearlet system  constitutes a Parseval frame for  consisting of bandlimited functions.

Although a compactly supported shearlet system does not generally form a Parseval frame, any function  can be represented by the shearlet expansion due to its frame property.

Cone-adapted shearlets 

One drawback of shearlets defined as above is the directional bias of shearlet elements associated with large shearing parameters.
This effect is already recognizable in the frequency tiling of classical shearlets (see Figure in Section #Examples), where the frequency support of a shearlet increasingly aligns along the -axis as the shearing parameter  goes to infinity. 
This causes serious problems when analyzing a function whose Fourier transform is concentrated around the -axis.

To deal with this problem, the frequency domain is divided into a low-frequency part and two conic regions (see Figure):

The associated cone-adapted discrete shearlet system consists of three parts, each one corresponding to one of these frequency domains.
It is generated by three functions  and a lattice sampling factor 

where

with

Finally, the scaling function  is associated with the low-frequency part .

Applications 

 Image processing and computer sciences
 Denoising
 Inverse problems
 Image enhancement
 Edge detection
 Inpainting
 Image separation
 PDEs
 Resolution of the wavefront set 
 Transport equations
 Coorbit theory, characterization of smoothness spaces
 Differential geometry: manifold learning

Generalizations and extensions

 3D-Shearlets 
 -Shearlets 
 Parabolic molecules 
 Cylindrical Shearlets

See also 

 Wavelet transform
 Curvelet transform
 Contourlet transform
 Bandelet transform
 Chirplet transform
 Noiselet transform

References

External links 
 Homepage of Gitta Kutyniok
 Homepage of Demetrio Labate

Image processing
Time–frequency analysis
Signal processing
Wavelets